A disciple of St. Basil the Great, Saint Zeno the Hermit began life in a Christian family of privilege and status. From an early age he devoted himself to the study of letters and sciences and quickly distinguished himself and became known to all, for the multitude of his virtues, his perfect education, his morals, his physique and his distinguished parents.

When the Emperor Valens ascended the throne in 364 AD, he summoned the now famous Zeno to the palace and offered him a great position. Zeno accepted and spent his early adulthood in the emperor's service. When however there was a vacancy for the position of Royal Postman, Zeno offered his services. The position which Zeno occupied was one of significant respect and prestige for to be such a courier was to bear the implicit trust of the Emperor. Messages needed to arrive swiftly, secretly and safely to where they were sent and in antiquity, this was far from a guarantee. The persons selected to be messengers on the public post had to be both physically fit and morally incorruptible, worthy of the personal confidence of the Emperor. Working amongst the soldiers who were sent out to deliver the imperial edicts enabled him to be close to the Church Fathers, the ascetics and the common people who lived simply and virtuously in the provinces. During his time in the Royal Postal Service, a difficult and arduous task, Zeno stayed in monasteries and hermitages, praising and glorifying God. The name of the emperor's simple and humble postman had become known in every town and village, especially to the poor and suffering. A royal mission to Bishop Basil of Caesarea determined the later course of Zeno's life, as he was enchanted by Basil's eloquence, preaching and his humble, ascetic life.

Upon the death of the emperor in 378 AD Saint Zeno abandoned his military post and sought the ascetic life of a hermit.  Near Antioch he took up residence in a cave where he dwelt far from society for some forty years. He became well known for his humility and holiness. His mattress was a stack of grass on stones and he dressed in rags. His food was some bread, which a friend of his used to bring him every two days, and he brought the water himself from far away. He received a lot of grace from God for this ascetic practice. That is why it is said that when the Isaurians invaded that place and killed many ascetics, St. Zeno blinded them with his prayer, and they missed the door of his cell. 

Saint Zeno died in 417 AD at the age of 78, leaving a reputation as a holy hermit throughout the Byzantine Empire.

Zeno the Hermit of Antioch is commemorated on the 30th of January in the Orthodox and Byzantine Catholic Churches. In Greece he was declared the protector of postal workers by the Greek Post Office in 1968. He is commemorated with a holiday for all postal workers on the 10th of February.

See also

Christian monasticism
Stylites
Poustinia

References
Orthodox Church in America
St Zeno Holy Hermit Zeno ‘the Letter-Bearer’ of Cæsarea
Zeno In Greek
Zeno the postal worker and his Greek commemorative stamp
St Zeno in Greek

Hermits in the Roman Empire
5th-century Christian saints